Khandaker Abdul Hafeez (1 March 1930 - 5 September 2001) is an Awami League politician and the former member of parliament for Jessore-13.

Career
Hafeez was elected to parliament from Jessore-13 as an Awami League candidate in 1973.

References

Awami League politicians
1930 births
2001 deaths
1st Jatiya Sangsad members